Benjamin Karl Kelleher (born Auckland New Zealand 18 August 1987) is a New Zealand-born Australian combat sports fighter where he competes in professional boxing, MMA fighting, kickboxing and Muay Thai boxing.

Kelleher has fought over 80 times across all sports codes. In boxing, some of his most notable wins including winning the Australian National title against Jayden Joseph and the IBF Pan Pacific regional title against Patrick Ferguson.

Kickboxing 
On 27 April 2013, Kelleher fought Ray Dimachki for the WKN Australian super cruiserweight title under K1 rules. Kelleher won the fight by Majority Decision. On 2 August 2014, Kelleher fought New Zealander Ramegus Te Wake for the WKBF South Pacific Cruiserweight title. Kelleher won the fight by knockout. In November 2014, Kelleher took on Chris Birch. Kelleher won the fight by unanimous decision.  Kelleher retired from kickboxing after snapping his tibia and fibula, however, after two years from kickboxing, he returned to win a fight against Aaron Grigolon by unanimous decision in 2016.

Kickboxing titles 
 WKBF South Pacific Cruiserweight title
 WKN Australian super cruiserweight title

MMA 
On 15 September 2012, Kelleher fought for Australian MMA Middleweight title. Originally the fight was booked against Vik Grujic, however, it was later changed to Leon Johns. Kelleher won the fight by TKO. On 12 July 2013, Kelleher took on Daniel Way. At this point Kelleher was on a five fight winning streak across Kickboxing and MMA. Kelleher lost the fight by Split Decision. On 17 May 2014, Kelleher took on Dan Kelly for the AFC title. The winner would also get a possible fight with UFC in the future. Kelleher lost the fight by Submission.

MMA titles 
 Australian National Middleweight title

Boxing 
In December 2016, as well as being Anthony Mundine sparring partner while Mundine prepares for his fight against Danny Green, Kelleher also fought Daniel Russell on 3 December. The fight ended in a Split Decision draw. On 7 November 2017, Kelleher was scheduled to fight Brett Petters in a rematch, after their original fight ended in a draw on 18 March. Unfortunately the fight did not happen. On 13 December 2017, Kelleher was scheduled to fight Daniel Russell in a rematch on the Jeff Horn world title defence undercard. Unfortunately this fight did not happen.

After a successful win over New Zealander Nikolas Charalampous for the ANBF Australasian title, Kelleher fought Jai Opetaia for the first time in January 2018 for the Australian National Cruiserweight title. Kelleher lost the fight by TKO stoppage in the third round. After a successful win over Robert Ferguson, Kelleher took on Jayden Joseph for his second attempt at the Australian National Cruiserweight title in July 2018. Kelleher won the fight by unanimous decision with judges scoring judges 97–94, 97–93, and 99–91. Kelleher went on to defeat kickboxer Brad Traynor in a boxing fight. In September 2018, Kelleher was sparring with famous Rugby star Quade Cooper in hopes that Quade Cooper would fight on the Jeff Horn vs Anothony Mundine undercard, However, Cooper did not fight in the end.

After his successful Australian title defence against Uria Afamasaga, in the biggest fight of his career, Keheller fought American Patrick Ferguson for the vacant IBF Pan Pacific Cruiserweight title. Kelleher won the fight the fight by Unanimous decision, winning his first major regional title. Kelleher went to fight Quintin Carey. Kelleher won the fight by unanimous decision.

In November 2019, Kelleher sparred with Barry Hall to prepare for Halls fight against Paul Gallen. Due to the COVID-19 Pandemic, Kelleher was not able to secure a fight until October 2020. Kelleher was originally scheduled to fight David Light in August 2020, however due to the Pandemic in New Zealand, the fight was called off. In the second time of his career, Kelleher took on Jai Opetaia but this time for the WBO Global and IBF Asia Oceania Cruiserweight titles. Kelleher lost the fight by TKO in the sixth round. After a win over Waikato Falefehi, Kelleher took on former world title challenger to try capture the Australian National Cruiserweight title for the second time of his career. Kelleher lost the fight by fifth-round TKO.

On the 19th of March 2022, Kelleher took on New Zealand-born Australian Peter Sa'lesui. Sa'lesui won the fight by Majority Decision. The two fought again on the 7th of May 2022, but this time for the vacant IBO Oceania-Orient Cruiserweight title. Sa'lesui won the rematch by Split Decision.

Boxing titles 
 Universal Boxing Organisation
 UBO Asia Pacific Cruiserweight title
 Australian National Boxing Federation
 Australasian Cruiserweight title
 Australian National Cruiserweight title
 International Boxing Federation
 IBF Pan Pacific Cruiserweight title

Professional boxing record

References

External links

Professional MMA record for Benjamin Kelleher from Tapology
Boxing record for Benjamin Kelleher from Pro Boxing Aus

Living people
Cruiserweight boxers
Australian male boxers
New Zealand male boxers
1987 births